Rubellite "Ruby" Kawena Kinney Johnson is a Historian of Hawaii.

Life
Her father was Ernest Kaipoleimanu Kinney (1906–1987) and mother was Esther Kauikeaulani Kaulili (1913–1979).
Her maternal grandparents were Solomon Kamaha Kaulili and Kawena Ah Chong. Her paternal grandparents were William Kihapiilani Kinney (1868–1953) and his sister, although the incest is hidden by the usage of a maid named Mary Francesca Vierra (c. 1879–1915).
Her paternal great-grandfather was William Kinney (1832–1915) who came to the Hawaiian Islands from Nova Scotia.
She was named for the mineral rubellite which is more commonly called tourmaline.
Her grandfather was also known as K. W. Kinney to avoid confusion with his half-brother William Ansel Kinney who became a prominent lawyer and then betrayed the Queen in legal representation on behalf of the Kingdom of Hawaii.
Another of her grandfather's half-brothers, Ray Kinney (1900–1979), became a popular Hawaiian musician. She was born on the island of Kauai.
She married geophysicist Rockne H. Johnson, and had four children: Dane Aukai, Moanilehua, Kaleihanamau and Lilinoe.  Her grandchildren are Aukai C., Dana R. and Neil P. (Dane A.), Kuawehi K. and Lourdes E. (Kaleihanamau), Mahina K., Kuuiini K, Elliott K., Kaiakea H. (deceased), Lehua K. (Moanilehua), and Lena K (Lilinoe, deceased).

From 1967 to 1993 she was on the faculty of the University of Hawaii, where she helped establish its Hawaiian studies program. She then became Professor Emeritus of Hawaiian Language and Literature and continued to publish. She researched the history of the Kumulipo, a sacred chant of Hawaiian mythology, and early newspapers in the Hawaiian language.

Johnson was named one of the Living Treasures of Hawai'i in 1983 by the Honpa Hongwanji Mission of Hawai'i.
She was selected as an advisory committee to the United States Commission on Civil Rights. She generally opposes the Akaka Bill for its avoidance of child welfare matters and failure to bring trials for Hawaiian children.
She submitted testimony as an expert witness on March 1, 2005, at the US Senate Committee on Indian Affairs.

Works

References

External links
 

20th-century births
Historians of Hawaii
Living people
Women historians
Year of birth missing (living people)